Why? with Hannibal Buress is an American late-night television series hosted by Hannibal Buress. On March 10, 2015, the series was green-lit for an eight-episode season. The series premiered on July 8, 2015, on Comedy Central. The show was meant to provide a look into the host's mind with episodes undertaking social issues through sketches, man on the street interviews, special guests and stand-up in front of a studio audience. In December 2015, Hannibal Buress confirmed the series would not return for a second season. He told the New York Post that "it wasn't the ideal format for me."

Episodes

References

External links
 

2015 American television series debuts
2015 American television series endings
2010s American late-night television series
Comedy Central original programming
Television series by 3 Arts Entertainment